Ga'ash (lit. Storm) is a kibbutz in central Israel. Located in the coastal plain to the north of Tel Aviv, it falls under the jurisdiction of Hof HaSharon Regional Council.

Etymology
The village was named after the Biblical mountain of Gaash, beside the grave of Joshuah in Ephraim (Joshuah 24:30).

History
Ga'ash is located on lands which used to belong to  the depopulated Palestinian village  of  Khirbat al-Zababida.

The kibbutz was established on 5 July 1951 by a group of immigrants from South America who were members of the Latin America "A Group" of Hashomer Hatzair. The founders had defended Negba during the 1948 Arab–Israeli War, and had formed the kibbutz community at Ahli Kahsem near Bnei Zion in November 1949.

References

External links

Kibbutzim
Kibbutz Movement
Populated places established in 1951
Populated places in Central District (Israel)
South American-Jewish culture in Israel
1951 establishments in Israel